The Society for Vascular Surgery (SVS) is the major national academic society for vascular surgery in the United States. Its mission includes education, research, career development and advocacy. The SVS is the national advocate for more than 6,000 specialty-trained vascular surgeons and other medical professionals who are dedicated to the prevention and cure of vascular disease. The association was founded in 1946. The SVS is the sponsor organization for the Journal of Vascular Surgery (JVS) and for the national Vascular Annual Meeting (VAM).

Journal of Vascular Surgery
JVS is an open access, peer reviewed academic journal published by Elsevier. It has published several of the most notable academic papers in the field of vascular surgery. In 2013, JVS had an impact factor of 2.98. In 2014, JVS launched an additional journal, "JVS: Venous and Lymphatic Disorders".

Vascular Annual Meeting
The VAM is an academic meeting for vascular surgery in the United States. It includes oral and poster presentations on research conducted in vascular surgery in the United States and around the world, as well as  demonstrations from medical device companies and a keynote address from the president of the society.

References

Surgical organizations based in the United States
Medical and health professional associations in Chicago
Vascular surgery
1947 establishments in the United States